Jean-Pierre Pernaut (8 April 1950 – 2 March 2022) was a French news presenter and broadcaster. He was widely known simply by his initials, JPP.

Biography
Pernaut was born in Amiens, Somme, on 8 April 1950. The regular presenter of station TF1's lunchtime news bulletin, the 13 Heures (1pm) between 1988 and 2020, Pernaut's combination of avuncular personality and authoritative delivery made him one of France's most popular news readers.

Also editor-in-chief of the bulletin, Pernaut long promoted a deliberate policy of trivial content in each edition, usually running items about local culture and traditional crafts towards the end of the broadcast.

The approach won a regular audience of between seven and eight million for the 13 Heures, a considerable figure for a lunchtime news programme.

From 1991 to 2010 he was also the longtime presenter of Combien ça coûte ? (How much does that cost?), a monthly consumer programme, again on TF1. Furthermore, from 1988 until his death Pernaut served on the board of directors of TF1 Group as a representative of the firm's employees.

Pernaut, partner of former Miss France winner Nathalie Marquay, published his best-selling memoirs, Pour tout vous dire.... (To tell you everything... ), in 2005. Shortly before that, he published two volumes of Les magnifiques métiers de l'artisanat (Splendid trades of the craft industry), which were glossy, but informative, tomes devoted to the subjects which have made his news bulletins so distinctive.

Pernaut died from lung cancer in Paris on 2 March 2022, at the age of 71.

References 

1950 births
2022 deaths
French Confederation of Christian Workers members
French television journalists
French television presenters
Commanders of the Ordre national du Mérite
Chevaliers of the Légion d'honneur
People from Amiens
Deaths from lung cancer in France